Welcome to Hard Times may refer to:

 Welcome to Hard Times (novel), by E.L. Doctorow
 Welcome to Hard Times (film), an adaptation of the novel